Peyton Sellers (born October 20, 1983) is an American professional stock car racing driver. He won the 2005 and 2021 national championship of NASCAR's Weekly Racing Series. He competed for several seasons in both the NASCAR Xfinity Series and Camping World Truck Series.

Racing career

Local racing
Sellers started his racing career in karting, beginning at age 7. By age 13, Sellers was driving open wheel sprint cars, collecting 11 feature wins in his first 20 races. After competing for several years in Sprints, Sellers decided to try his hand in stock car racing on asphalt ovals. He ran the 2001 season in the Limited Sportsman division at Orange County Speedway in Rougemont, North Carolina. He competed at South Boston Speedway in Virginia as a rookie in 2002, winning Rookie of the Year honors in the Late Model Stock Car division.

In 2005, Sellers won 14 of his 16 starts at South Boston, winning the Dodge Weekly Series National championship.

National NASCAR racing
In 2006 Sellers raced in the NASCAR West Division, where he drove the No. 16 NAPA Auto Parts Chevrolet, his only win coming at Douglas County Speedway on July 1, 2006. He was a member of the Richard Childress Racing driver development program during that season. Sellers also competed in his first NASCAR Busch Series race at New Hampshire International Speedway, driving the No. 31 Chevrolet for Marsh Racing.

Sellers headed back east for the 2007 season and raced out of his home shop with brother, HC Sellers, as crew chief. Sellers finished 3rd overall in the NASCAR Busch East Series. He would go on to finish 2nd in the Toyota All-Star Showdown.

In 2008, Sellers signed on with Andy Santerre Motorsports in the No. 44 Chevrolet. Sellers took the pole and the win at the season opener at Greenville-Pickens Speedway, in Greenville, SC. The victory was short-lived due to a rules infraction. Sellers was stripped of his win and given a 30th-place finish.  At Iowa, in the closing laps, Sellers took second from Austin Dillon before a caution but he was placed back into fourth place on the restart (the position he was in on the restart after the previous yellow) because the NASCAR officials determined that a full lap had not been run since Sellers was in fourth and he never had the chance to challenge Brian Ickler for the lead. In the season finale, at Stafford Sellers finally win his first race. He finished the season 8th overall points standings, with a series high 3 poles. Peyton again came close to taking the win at the Toyota All-Star Showdown, with Jig-A-Loo as his sponsor, when a last lap spin out, while in the lead, made him finish 14th.
The announcement came in December 2008 that Sellers would run a limited Nationwide Series schedule in 2009 with Cardinal Motorsports. Sellers is part owner of Cardinal motorsports, alongside Will Spencer of JKS Motorsports and Ed Berrier. In January Cardinal Motorsports announced a ten race NASCAR Nationwide sponsorship with SFP.

Sellers was suspended from NASCAR competition on October 25, 2011, as a result of an altercation following a race at South Boston Speedway until March 1, 2012.

For 2015, Sellers planned to race in the NASCAR Xfinity Series full-time, taking over the No. 97 for Obaika Racing after Josh Reaume was released from the team after three race weekends, but was released from the team after Watkins Glen due to mediocre results.

After leaving NASCAR competition as a driver, Sellers he co-owned NASCAR K&N Pro Series East team Hunt-Sellers Racing with former KNPSE competitor Sam Hunt. However the partnership ended in 2018. Sam Hunt renamed his team to Sam Hunt Racing and moved to Xfinity Series.

Regional racing
Sellers' team (Sellers Racing Inc.) then fielded cars in the NASCAR Advance Auto Parts Weekly Series. Sellers continued to racing at local tracks. In 2021, Sellers won the track championships at Dominion Speedway and South Boston Speedway to win his second NASCAR Weekly Series championships by 34 points.

On April 2, 2022, the Superstar Racing Experience announced that Sellers would race in the series' June 25 race at South Boston.

Family life
Sellers grew up in Danville, Virginia. His parents are Mary and Burt Sellers. For his 2021 championship, his father was his spotter, his mother records the races, and his brother H.C. was his crew chief/team operator. Sellers' wife Jennie attended his races.

Motorsports career results

NASCAR
(key) (Bold – Pole position awarded by qualifying time. Italics – Pole position earned by points standings or practice time. * – Most laps led.)

Xfinity Series

Camping World Truck Series

K&N Pro Series East

Autozone West Series

 Season still in progress
 Ineligible for series points

ARCA Re/Max Series
(key) (Bold – Pole position awarded by qualifying time. Italics – Pole position earned by points standings or practice time. * – Most laps led.)

Rolex Sports Car Series
(key) Bold – Pole Position. (Overall Finish/Class Finish).

24 Hours of Daytona
(key)

Superstar Racing Experience
(key) * – Most laps led. 1 – Heat 1 winner. 2 – Heat 2 winner.

References

External links
 
 
 East Series Driver Card
 West Series Driver Card

Living people
1983 births
Sportspeople from Danville, Virginia
Racing drivers from Virginia
NASCAR drivers
ARCA Menards Series drivers